The following is a list of events affecting Canadian television in 2020. Events listed include television show debuts, finales, cancellations, and channel launches, closures and rebrandings.

Events

March

April

July

Programs

Programs debuting in 2020

Programs ending in 2020

Changes of network affiliation

Television films and specials

Networks and services

Network conversions and rebrandings

Network closures

Deaths
January 17 - Thérèse Dion, television personality (born 1927)
January 20 - Kit Hood, television editor (born 1943)
February 5 - Diane Cailhier, filmmaker and director (born 1947)
March 7 - Earl Pomerantz, screenwriter (born 1945)
April 3 - Logan Williams, 16, actor (The Whispers, The Flash, When Calls the Heart, Supernatural), fentanyl overdose.
April 5 - Shirley Douglas, actress and activist
April 7 - Ghyslain Tremblay, actor and comedian (born 1951)
April 11 - Paul Haddad, actor (born 1963)
April 19 - Claude Lafortune, television presenter (born 1936)
May 7 - Joyce Davidson, 89, Canadian television presenter, COVID-19.
May 10 - Martin Pasko, 65, Canadian-born American comic book writer and screenwriter (Max Headroom, Roseanne, Batman: The Animated Series).
May 12 - Renée Claude, 80, Canadian actress (Avec un grand A, He Shoots, He Scores) and singer, COVID-19.
May 16 - Monique Mercure, 89, Canadian actress (L'héritage, Providence, Mémoires vives), cancer.
May 18 - Michelle Rossignol, 80, Canadian actress.
May 22 - André Cartier, 74, Canadian actor (Passe-Partout).
July 5 - Nick Cordero, actor (born 1978)
November 8 - Alex Trebek, newsman (CBC Television) and game show host (The $128,000 Question, Reach for the Top, Pitfall and the American version of Jeopardy! among many others) (born 1940)

The year also saw the death of wrestlers Rocky Johnson, Bobby Kay, Steve Gillespie, all of whom performed in televised leagues.

References